Nothing Is Underrated is the second solo album by Fugazi bassist Joe Lally. As the follow-up to Lally's debut, There to Here, it stylistically similar in its woody, bass-oriented grooves. Much like its predecessor, Nothing Is Underrated features various members of Washington D.C. groups such as Faraquet, the Capitol City Dusters, Medications, The Out Circuit, the Delta 72, Capillary Action, Rites of Spring, and Lally's band mates in Fugazi.

Track listing
 "Day is Born" - 2:29
 "Scavenger's Garden" - 3:21
 "Map of the World" - 3:28
 "Tonight at Ten" - 2:33
 "Via Nomentana" - 2:40
 "Motora" - 2:24
 "Skin and Bone" - 3:14
 "Pieces of String" - 2:53
 "Door Closing" - 2:51
 "The Space Program" - 3:03
 "Mistaken Identity" - 2:45
 "Painfully Aware" - 2:35
 "Strascinata" - 2:20

Personnel
 Joe Lally – bass, vocals
 Ian MacKaye – guitar
 Guy Picciotto – guitar
 Devin Ocampo – drums
 Ricardo Lagomasino - drums
 Sam Krulewitch - keyboards
 Jason Kourkounis - drums
 Eddie Janney - guitar
 Andy Gale - drums

References

2007 albums
Joe Lally albums